Hary Isac Zilberman a.k.a. Haralamb Zincă (born 4 July 1923 in Roman – died 24 December 2008 in Bucharest) was a Romanian writer.

Books
 Amintire (1956)
 Cazul R-16
 Ultima toamnă (1958)
 Popasuri... (1959)
 Dintre sute de catarge (1961)
 Palma lui Hercules (1963)
 Sfârşitul spionului Fantomă (1963)
 Zefirul (1964)
 Taina cavalerului de Dolenga (1965)
 Moartea vine pe bandă de magnetofon (1967)
 Ochii doctorului King (1968)
 O crimă aproape perfectă (1969)
 Şi a fost ora H (1971)
 Un caz de dispariţie : Anchete sociale (1972)
 Dispărut fără urmă (1973)
 Limuzina neagră (1973)
 Supersonicul 01 Decolează in Zori (1974)
 Un glonte pentru rezident (1975)
 Soarele a murit în zori (1976)
 Mapa cenuşie G.R. (1977)
 Toamna cu frunze negre (1978)
 Eu, H.Z., aventurierul (1979)
 Anotimpurile morţii (1980)
 Glonţul de zahăr (1981)
 Destinul căpitanului Iamandi (1982)
 Dosarul aviatorului singuratic (1983)
 Operaţiunea "Soare" (1984)
 Ultima noapte de război, prima zi de pace (1985)
 Noaptea cea mai lungă. Cartea I: Dincolo de întuneric  (1986)
 Noaptea cea mai lungă. Cartea II: Marea confruntare (1987)
 Fiecare om cu clepsidra lui (1988)
 Revelion 45 (1989)
 Suspecta moarte a lui Mario Campanella (1991)
 Coşciugul agentului K-05 (1991)
 "Spion" prin arhive secrete (1993)
 Moartea m-a bătut pe umăr (1993)
 Dragul meu Sherlock Holmes (1993)
 Interpolul transmite: arestaţi-l! (1993)
 Moarta mirosea a Christian Dior (1997)
 Noiembrie însângerat (2000)

References

1923 births
2008 deaths
20th-century Romanian writers
People from Roman, Romania
Romanian male writers